New Richmond is a city in St. Croix County, Wisconsin, United States. Its population was 10,079 as of the 2020 census.

History
New Richmond was founded in 1857. The first permanent settlement was established by Hiram Foster, who had led a group of settlers from Vermont into the area in search of virgin Wisconsin timber for harvesting. Foster built and operated a sawmill on the banks of the Willow River, which gradually drew more settlers from New England into the area. For the first few years the settlement was called Foster's Crossing, and was later renamed after Richmond Day, the land surveyor who plotted the town. Because another town in Wisconsin had already taken the name Richmond, it was decided to call the town New Richmond. In 1871, New Richmond was made a station on the southwestern branch of Chicago, St. Paul, Minneapolis & Omaha Railroad's 'Omaha X' network, initially working northwards from Hudson to New Richmond and providing a direct connection to St. Paul. Construction on the line continued northeast of New Richmond, reaching Spooner, Wisconsin in 1879. In addition to a steady stream of newcomers from New England, New Richmond saw an influx of Irish immigrants throughout the 1870s and early 1880s, later followed by large numbers of Germans, Norwegians and a few Swedes throughout the 1880s and 1890s. In 1885, the Wisconsin Central Railroad built a line into the north side of town westward from Chippewa Falls, from where it later continued towards Stillwater and on to St. Paul.

On the early evening of June 12, 1899, a deadly tornado tore through St. Croix, Polk and Barron counties along a 46-mile path. While most of the F5-strength storm's path was confined to rural areas, New Richmond suffered a direct hit, with half the town's residences leveled as well as the entire business district. In all, the tornado killed 117 people, 111 at New Richmond alone, injured more than 125, left over 1,500 people homeless and caused an estimated $18 million in damage. Due to state and federal aid and a large amount of donations, most of the homes and all but two of the businesses destroyed in the storm were able to rebuild by the following winter. Today, the tornado ranks as the deadliest ever recorded in Wisconsin and the ninth deadliest tornado in American history. Most of Main Street (Knowles Avenue) was rebuilt within five months.

Geography

New Richmond is located at  (45.119856, −92.539142).

A major source of hydrological water is from the Willow River, which is dammed near the center of town.

Demographics

2010 census
As of the census of 2010, there were 8,375 people, 3,421 households, and 2,094 families residing in the city. The racial makeup of the city was 95.5% White, 1.3% African American, 0.6% Native American, 0.7% Asian, 0.3% from other races, and 1.6% from two or more races. Hispanic or Latino of any race were 2.1% of the population.

There were 3,421 households, of which 34.2% had children under the age of 18 living with them, 44.9% were married couples living together, 10.9% had a female householder with no husband present, 5.4% had a male householder with no wife present, and 38.8% were non-families. 31.4% of all households were made up of individuals, and 10.9% had someone living alone who was 65 years of age or older. The average household size was 2.37 and the average family size was 3.01.

The median age in the city was 33.9 years. 26.1% of residents were under the age of 18; 8% were between the ages of 18 and 24; 30.3% were from 25 to 44; 23.2% were from 45 to 64; and 12.4% were 65 years of age or older. The gender makeup of the city was 48.9% male and 51.1% female.

2000 census
As of the census of 2000, there were 6,310 people, 2,561 households, and 1,546 families residing in the city. The racial makeup of the city was 98.15% White, 0.22% African American, 0.24% Native American, 0.35% Asian, 0.13% from other races, and 0.92% from two or more races. Hispanic or Latino of any race were 0.78% of the population.

There were 2,561 households, out of which 33.2% had children under the age of 18 living with them, 46.3% were married couples living together, 10.1% had a female householder with no husband present, and 39.6% were non-families. 31.5% of all households were made up of individuals, and 11.8% had someone living alone who was 65 years of age or older. The average household size was 2.38 and the average family size was 3.06.

In the city, the population was spread out, with 26.3% under the age of 18, 9.5% from 18 to 24, 30.8% from 25 to 44, 18.2% from 45 to 64, and 15.1% who were 65 years of age or older. The median age was 34 years. For every 100 females, there were 91.7 males. For every 100 females age 18 and over, there were 88.0 males.

The median income for a household in the city was $43,475, and the median income for a family was $52,422. Males had a median income of $37,306 versus $27,153 for females. The per capita income for the city was $19,840. About 4.2% of families and 6.8% of the population were below the poverty line, including 4.8% of those under age 18 and 11.3% of those age 65 or over.

Education
The New Richmond School district consists of three elementary schools, Starr, Hillside, and Paperjack; New Richmond Middle School; and New Richmond High School.

Northwood Technical College New Richmond is a technical college that serves New Richmond and the surrounding area. Northwood also has campuses in Rice Lake, Ashland, and Superior, Wisconsin.

Infrastructure
New Richmond station previously served passenger trains on the Soo Line Railroad.

Roads
Wisconsin Highways 64 and 65 are main routes in the community.  Highway 64 runs east–west, and Highway 65 / Knowles Avenue runs north–south.  Other main routes include County Roads A, CC, and K, and Fourth Street.

Airport
The New Richmond Regional Airport (ICAO: KRNH) is a large general aviation airport north of New Richmond's central business district that serves the region and the military. The airport is considered the largest in Wisconsin in terms of the number of hangars at the airport, which total 117.  The airport ranks second in Wisconsin in terms of based aircraft totaling 225.  The nearest airport with commercial flights is Minneapolis-Saint Paul International Airport.

Notable people

[Robert M. Boche]], Wisconsin State Representative, resided in New Richmond
 {[Jessie Connors]], contestant from the first season of The Apprentice (US), born in New Richmond
 John Doar, civil rights attorney
 Michael P. Early, Wisconsin State Representative, born in New Richmond
 Casey Finnegan, college football coach; born in New Richmond
 Albert W. Hillestad, Episcopal Bishop of Springfield, Illinois, born in New Richmond
 Warren P. Knowles, Governor of Wisconsin, practiced law in New Richmond
 Scott Lynch, fantasy author, resides in New Richmond
 John McNally, football player for the Green Bay Packers (1929–1936), member of the Pro Football Hall of Fame, former NFL head coach, born in New Richmond
 Ethan B. Minier, Wisconsin State Representative, lawyer, and farmer, lived near New Richmond
 David William Olien, Author, General Officer of the University of Illinois, Executive Vice President of the University of Wisconsin, was raised in New Richmond 
George Oakes, Wisconsin State Representative and lawyer, born near New Richmond
 Roy Vassau, professional football player for the Milwaukee Badgers, born in New Richmond
 William W. Ward, Wisconsin State Representative and lawyer, resided in New Richmond
 Orrin J. Williams, Wisconsin State Representative, resided in New Richmond

See also
 List of cities in Wisconsin

References

Further reading 
 Reppe, James D., Beverly S. Hooser, and Mary A. Sather. Over on the East Side, New Richmond, Wisconsin. New Richmond, Wis: New Richmond Heritage Center, 2007.
 Reppe, James D., and Mary A. Sather. Down on the South Side, New Richmond, Wisconsin. New Richmond, Wis: New Richmond Heritage Center, 2008.
 Reppe, James D., and Mary A. Sather. Moving West: The First Suburb, New Richmond, Wisconsin. New Richmond, Wis: New Richmond Heritage Center, 2005.
 Reppe, James D., and Mary A. Sather. Up on the Northside, New Richmond, Wisconsin. New Richmond, Wis: New Richmond Heritage Center, 2006. 
 Sather, Mary A. Sesquicentennial Tales: 150 New Richmondites, 1857-2007, New Richmond, Wisconsin. New Richmond, Wis.: New Richmond Heritage Center, 2007.
 Sather, Mary A. They Built Their City Twice: A History of New Richmond, Wisconsin. New Richmond, Wis: New Richmond Preservation Society, 1998.
 Sather, Mary A., and James D. Reppe. Historic New Richmond Downtown, 1899-2009, New Richmond, Wisconsin. New Richmond, Wis: New Richmond Heritage Center, 2009.

External links

 New Richmond Heritage Center
 City of New Richmond
 Sanborn fire insurance maps: 1887 1892 1900 1912
 New Richmond aerial photos

Cities in Wisconsin
Cities in St. Croix County, Wisconsin